The Henderson H.S.F.1 was a British six-seat low-wing monoplane designed by J. Bewsher and built by the Henderson School of Flying. Only one aircraft was built and it was scrapped in 1930 following the death of the owner George Lockhart Piercy Henderson.

Design and development
The H.S.F.1 was a twin-boom pusher monoplane powered by a  Siddeley Puma engine. Designed by J. Bewsher it was built in a shed at Byfleet in Surrey and assembled at Brooklands Aerodrome by the Henderson School of Flying in 1928. Originally built with an enclosing cabin top; this was removed and it flew its first flight at Brooklands by Henderson with an open cockpit. The aircraft carried 30 passengers in total on its first day.

In April 1930 it was tested by the Air Ministry at Martlesham Heath. Henderson died in July 1930 in the crash of a Junkers F.13 at Meopham following which the H.S.F.1 was scrapped.

Specifications

See also

Notes

References

Bibliography

1920s British civil utility aircraft
Twin-boom aircraft
Single-engined pusher aircraft
Aircraft first flown in 1929